Thomas E. Burrows (born September 14, 1994) is an American professional baseball pitcher who is a free agent. The Seattle Mariners selected Burrows in the fourth round, with the 117th overall selection, of the 2016 MLB draft.

Career
Burrows attended Mars Hill Bible School in Florence, Alabama. As a pitcher for the school's baseball team, he was named to the Alabama Sports Writers Association Super All-State team in 2012 and 2013. 

He enrolled at the University of Alabama, where he played college baseball for the Alabama Crimson Tide. He was named a Freshman All-American by the National Collegiate Baseball Writers Association (NCBWA) and Collegiate Baseball Newspaper in 2014. He was also added to the watch list for the NCBWA Stopper of the Year Award. During the summer of 2015, he played collegiate summer baseball for the Hyannis Harbor Hawks of the Cape Cod Baseball League. He set a Crimson Tide record with 30 saves in his collegiate career.

The Seattle Mariners selected Burrows in the fourth round, with the 117th overall selection, of the 2016 MLB draft. After he signed with the Mariners, he made his professional debut with the Everett AquaSox of the Class A-Short Season Northwest League for whom in  innings he had an ERA of 2.55. On January 11, 2017, the Mariners traded Burrows and Luiz Gohara to the Atlanta Braves for Mallex Smith and Shae Simmons. The Braves assigned him to the Rome Braves, where he spent all of 2017, posting a 3–5 record with a 2.16 ERA in  innings pitched. He began the 2018 season with Rome before being promoted to the Florida Fire Frogs of the Class A-Advanced Florida State League, and finishing the season with the Mississippi Braves of the Class AA Southern League. Over 45 relief appearances between the three clubs, he went 6–2 with a 2.66 ERA. In 2019, he split time between Mississippi and the Class AAA International League Gwinnett Stripers, going 2–4 with a 4.42 ERA and 63 strikeouts over 57 innings. The 2020 Minor League Baseball season was cancelled due to the COVID-19 pandemic. Burrows began the 2021 season at spring training, and returned to minor league camp in March. He spent the remainder of the year with the Gwinnett Stripers. He elected free agency after the 2022 season.

References

External links

1994 births
Living people
Sportspeople from Florence, Alabama
Baseball players from Alabama
Baseball pitchers
Alabama Crimson Tide baseball players
Hyannis Harbor Hawks players
Everett AquaSox players
Rome Braves players
Florida Fire Frogs players
Mississippi Braves players
Peoria Javelinas players
Gwinnett Stripers players